Glenwood station may refer to:

 Glenwood station (Rochester), a former rapid transit station in Rochester, New York
 Glenwood station (Metro-North), a Metro-North commuter rail station in Yonkers, New York
 Glenwood Springs station, a railway station in Glenwood Springs, Colorado
 Glenwood Iron Mountain Railroad Depot, a historic train station in Glenwood, Arkansas

See also
Glenwood Generating Station, a power station in Glenwood Landing, New York
Yonkers Power Station, an abandoned electrical plant in Glenwood, New York